This is a list of 413 species in Liriomyza, a genus of leaf miner flies in the family Agromyzidae.

Liriomyza species

 Liriomyza abnormis Spencer, 1981 i c g
 Liriomyza aclepiadis Spencer, 1969 i g
 Liriomyza aculeolata Zlobin, 2002 c g
 Liriomyza admiranda Spencer, 1981 i c g
 Liriomyza aestiva Zlobin, 1997 c g
 Liriomyza alaskensis Spencer, 1969 i c g
 Liriomyza allia (Frost, 1943) i c g
 Liriomyza alpicola (Strobl, 1898) c g
 Liriomyza alticola Singh & Ipe, 1973 c g
 Liriomyza alyssi Hering, 1960 c g
 Liriomyza amarellae Hering, 1963 c g
 Liriomyza americana Schiner, 1868 c g
 Liriomyza amoena (Meigen, 1830) c g
 Liriomyza anaphalidis Sasakawa, 1961 c g
 Liriomyza andina Malloch, 1934 c g
 Liriomyza andryalae hering, 1927 c g
 Liriomyza andryalae hering , 1927 g
 Liriomyza angulicornis (Malloch, 1918) i c g
 Liriomyza anthemidis Pakalniskis, 1994 c g
 Liriomyza antipoda Harrison, 1976 c g
 Liriomyza antiquaria Spencer, 1977 c g
 Liriomyza aposeridis Beiger, 1972 c g
 Liriomyza approximata Hendel, 1920 c g
 Liriomyza apsara Singh & Ipe, 1973 c g
 Liriomyza archboldi Frost, 1962 i c g
 Liriomyza arctii Spencer, 1969 i c g
 Liriomyza arnaudi Spencer, 1981 i c g
 Liriomyza artemisiae Spencer, 1981 i c g
 Liriomyza artemisicola Meijere, 1924 c g
 Liriomyza artemsicola de Meijere, 1924 c g
 Liriomyza asclepiadis Spencer, 1969 c g b  (milkweed leaf-miner fly)
 Liriomyza asphodeli Spencer, 1957 c g
 Liriomyza assimilis (Malloch, 1918) i c g
 Liriomyza asteriphila Zlobin, 1996 c g
 Liriomyza asteris Hering, 1928 c g
 Liriomyza asterivora Sasakawa, 1956 c g
 Liriomyza aterrima Pakalniskis, 1998 c g
 Liriomyza atrescens Spencer, 1961 c g
 Liriomyza avicenniae Martinez & Etienne, 2002 c g
 Liriomyza baccharidis Spencer, 1963 i c g
 Liriomyza balcanica Strobl, 1900 c g
 Liriomyza balcanicoides (Sehgal, 1971) i g
 Liriomyza baptisiae (Frost, 1931) i c g b
 Liriomyza barrocoloradensis Frost, 1936 c g
 Liriomyza bartaki Cerny, 2007 c g
 Liriomyza beata Hendel, 1931 c g
 Liriomyza belcanicoides Sehgal, 1971 c g
 Liriomyza bella Spencer, 1981 i c g
 Liriomyza bellissima (Spencer, 1969) i c g
 Liriomyza bessarabica Hering, 1941 c g
 Liriomyza bharati Singh & Ipe, 1973 c g
 Liriomyza biensis Boucher g
 Liriomyza biformata Becker, 1919 c g
 Liriomyza bifurcata Sehgal, 1971 i c g
 Liriomyza bispinosa Sasakawa, 1992 c g
 Liriomyza bituberculata Sasakawa, 1994 c g
 Liriomyza blechi Spencer, 1973 i c g b
 Liriomyza bogotensis Sanabria de Arevalo, 1993 c g
 Liriomyza borealis (Malloch, 1913) i c g
 Liriomyza brassicae (Riley, 1885) i c g b  (serpentine leaf miner)
 Liriomyza braziliae Spencer, 1963 c g
 Liriomyza braziliensis Frost, 1939 c g
 Liriomyza brunnifrons (Malloch, 1914) c g
 Liriomyza bryoniae (Kaltenbach, 1858) c g
 Liriomyza buhri Hering, 1937 c g
 Liriomyza bulbata Hendel, 1931 c g
 Liriomyza bulbipalpis Tschirnhaus, 1992 c g
 Liriomyza bulgarica Beiger, 1979 c g
 Liriomyza bullati Spencer, 1963 c g
 Liriomyza bulnesiae Spencer, 1963 c g
 Liriomyza caesalpiniae Valladares, 1991 c g
 Liriomyza californiensis Spencer, 1981 i c g
 Liriomyza canescens Spencer, 1976 c g
 Liriomyza cannabis Hendel, 1931 c g
 Liriomyza cardamines Sasakawa, 1954 c g
 Liriomyza cardariae Sasakawa, 2008 c g
 Liriomyza cassiniae Spencer, 1977 c g
 Liriomyza caulophaga (Kleinschmidt, 1960) c g
 Liriomyza cekalovici Spencer, 1982 c g
 Liriomyza centaureae hering, 1927 c g
 Liriomyza centaureae hering , 1927 g
 Liriomyza cepae hering, 1927 c g
 Liriomyza cepae hering , 1927 g
 Liriomyza certosa Spencer, 1961 c g
 Liriomyza cestri Spencer, 1982 c g
 Liriomyza chemsaki Spencer, 1981 i c g
 Liriomyza chenopodii (Watt, 1924) g
 Liriomyza chilensis (Malloch, 1934) c g
 Liriomyza chinensis (Kato, 1949) c g
 Liriomyza chlamydata (Melander, 1913) i c g
 Liriomyza cicerina (Rondani, 1875) c g
 Liriomyza cilicornis Hendel, 1931 c g
 Liriomyza cirriformis Sanabria de Arevalo, 1993 c g
 Liriomyza citreifemorata (Watt, 1923) c g
 Liriomyza clarae Beiger, 1972 c g
 Liriomyza clianthi (Watt, 1923) c g
 Liriomyza cocculi (Frick) i c g
 Liriomyza colombiella Spencer, 1984 c g
 Liriomyza commelinae (Frost, 1931) i c g b
 Liriomyza concepcionensis Spencer, 1982 c g
 Liriomyza congesta (Becker, 1903) c g
 Liriomyza cordillerana Sehgal, 1968 i c g
 Liriomyza coronillae Pakalniskis, 1994 c g
 Liriomyza cortesi Spencer, 1982 c g
 Liriomyza costaricana Spencer, 1983 c g
 Liriomyza craspediae Spencer, 1976 c g
 Liriomyza cruciferarum hering, 1927 c
 Liriomyza cruciferarum hering , 1927 g
 Liriomyza cyclaminis Suss, 1987 c g
 Liriomyza debilis Sasakawa, 1956 c g
 Liriomyza decempunctata Sasakawa, 1961 c g
 Liriomyza deceptiva (Malloch, 1918) i c g
 Liriomyza deficiens Hendel, 1931 c g
 Liriomyza demeijerei Hering, 1930 c g
 Liriomyza dendranthemae Nowakowski, 1975 c g
 Liriomyza denudata Spencer, 1981 i c g
 Liriomyza dianthicola (Venturi, 1949) c g
 Liriomyza diminuella Spencer, 1961 c g
 Liriomyza discalis (Malloch, 1913) i c g
 Liriomyza domestica Garg, 1971 c g
 Liriomyza dracunculi Hering, 1932 c g
 Liriomyza eboni Spencer, 1969 i c g
 Liriomyza edmontonensis Spencer, 1969 i c g
 Liriomyza electa Spencer, 1977 c g
 Liriomyza elevata Spencer, 1986 i c g
 Liriomyza elquensis Spencer, 1982 c g
 Liriomyza emiliae Seguy, 1951 c g
 Liriomyza endiviae Hering, 1955 i c g
 Liriomyza equiseti de Meijere, 1924 c g
 Liriomyza erucifolii De Meijere, 1943 c g
 Liriomyza eupatoriana Spencer, 1954 c g
 Liriomyza eupatoriella Spencer, 1986 i c g b
 Liriomyza eupatorii (Kaltenbach, 1874) i c g b
 Liriomyza euphorbiae Martinez & Sobhian, 1999 c g
 Liriomyza euphorbiana Hendel, 1931 c g
 Liriomyza europaea Zlobin, 2002 c g
 Liriomyza fasciola (Meigen, 1838) c g
 Liriomyza fasciventris (Becker, 1907) c g
 Liriomyza flavalis Spencer, 1959 c g
 Liriomyza flaveola (Fallen, 1823) i c g
 Liriomyza flaviantennata Spencer, 1966 c g
 Liriomyza flavicola Spencer, 1981 i c g
 Liriomyza flavocentralis (Watt, 1923) c g
 Liriomyza flavolateralis (Watt, 1923) c g
 Liriomyza flavonigra (Coquillett, 1902) i c g
 Liriomyza flavopicta Hendel, 1931 c g
 Liriomyza freidbergi Spencer, 1974 c g
 Liriomyza freyella Spencer, 1976 c g
 Liriomyza frickella Spencer, 1981 i c g
 Liriomyza fricki Spencer, 1965 i c g b
 Liriomyza frigida Spencer, 1981 i c g
 Liriomyza frommeri Spencer, 1981 i c g
 Liriomyza frontella (Malloch, 1914) c g
 Liriomyza furva Spencer, 1976 c g
 Liriomyza galiivora Spencer, 1969 c g b
 Liriomyza gayi Porter, 1915 c g
 Liriomyza geniculata Sasakawa, 1992 c g
 Liriomyza globulariae Hendel, 1931 c g
 Liriomyza graminacea Spencer, 1981 i c g
 Liriomyza graminivora Hering, 1949 c g
 Liriomyza grandis Spencer, 1963 c g
 Liriomyza groschkei Hering, 1956 c g
 Liriomyza guadeloupensis Martinez, 1992 c g
 Liriomyza gudmanni Hering, 1928 c g
 Liriomyza gypsophilae Beiger, 1972 c g
 Liriomyza hampsteadensis Spencer, 1971 c g
 Liriomyza haploneura Hendel, 1931 c g
 Liriomyza hebae Spencer, 1976 c g
 Liriomyza helenii Spencer, 1981 i c g
 Liriomyza helianthi Spencer, 1981 i c g
 Liriomyza helichrysi Spencer, 1963 c g
 Liriomyza helichrysivora Spencer, 1965 c g
 Liriomyza hemerocallis Iwasaki, 1993 c g
 Liriomyza heringi Nowakowski, 1961 c g
 Liriomyza herrerai Spencer, 1984 c g
 Liriomyza hieracii (Kaltenbach, 1862) c g
 Liriomyza hieracivora Spencer, 1971 c g
 Liriomyza himalayana Garg, 1971 c g
 Liriomyza homeri Spencer, 1976 c g
 Liriomyza hordei Spencer, 1984 c g
 Liriomyza huidobrensis (Blanchard, 1926) i c g
 Liriomyza hungarica Hendel, 1931 c g
 Liriomyza impolita Spencer, 1977 c g
 Liriomyza imurai Sasakawa, 1993 c g
 Liriomyza infuscata Hering, 1926 c g
 Liriomyza inopinata Spencer, 1977 c g
 Liriomyza insignis Spencer, 1963 c g
 Liriomyza intonsa Spencer, 1976 c g
 Liriomyza irazui Spencer, 1983 c g
 Liriomyza irwini Sasakawa, 1992 c g
 Liriomyza ivanauskasi Pakalniskis, 1998 c g
 Liriomyza jezoensis Sasakawa, 1961 c g
 Liriomyza katoi Sasakawa, 1961 c g
 Liriomyza kenti Spencer, 1969 i c g
 Liriomyza khekhtsirica Zlobin, 2002 c g
 Liriomyza kleiniae hering, 1927 c g
 Liriomyza kleiniae hering , 1927 g
 Liriomyza kovalevi Zlobin, 1998 c g
 Liriomyza kumaonensis Garg, 1971 c g
 Liriomyza kuscheli Spencer, 1964 c g
 Liriomyza labanoro Pakalniskis, 1992 c g
 Liriomyza lacertella (Rondani, 1875) c g
 Liriomyza langei Frick, 1951 c g b
 Liriomyza languida Spencer, 1977 c g
 Liriomyza lathyri Sehgal, 1971 i c g
 Liriomyza latigenis Hendel, 1920 c g
 Liriomyza latipalpis Hendel, 1920 c g
 Liriomyza lepida Spencer, 1977 c g
 Liriomyza lepidii Harrison, 1976 c g
 Liriomyza lesinensis Hering, 1967 c g
 Liriomyza lima (Melander, 1913) i c g
 Liriomyza limopsis  b
 Liriomyza limpida Hering, 1933 c g
 Liriomyza litorea Shiao & Wu, 1995 c g
 Liriomyza lituanica Pakalniskis, 1992 c g
 Liriomyza lolii Spencer, 1982 c g
 Liriomyza lopesi Olivera & Silva, 1954 c g
 Liriomyza lupinella Spencer, 1981 i c g
 Liriomyza lupini Spencer, 1981 i c g
 Liriomyza lupiniphaga Spencer, 1981 i c g
 Liriomyza lusatiensis Hering, 1956 c g
 Liriomyza lutea (Meigen, 1830) i c g
 Liriomyza maai Sasakawa, 2008 g
 Liriomyza madridensis Spencer, 1984 c g
 Liriomyza maipuensis Sasakawa, 1994 c g
 Liriomyza manii Singh & Ipe, 1973 c g
 Liriomyza manni Spencer, 1985 c g
 Liriomyza marginalis (Malloch, 1913) i c g b
 Liriomyza mariaecamilae Sanabria de Arevalo, 1993 c g
 Liriomyza mediterranea Hendel, 1931 c g
 Liriomyza melantherae Spencer, 1959 c g
 Liriomyza melitensis Spencer, 1973 c g
 Liriomyza menthavora Sanabria de Arevalo, 1993 c g
 Liriomyza meracula Spencer, 1977 c g
 Liriomyza microglossae Spencer, 1963 c g
 Liriomyza mikaniopsidis Spencer, 1961 c g
 Liriomyza mikanivora Spencer, 1973 c g
 Liriomyza minor Spencer, 1981 i c g
 Liriomyza mirifica Spencer, 1963 c g
 Liriomyza monoensis Spencer, 1981 i c g
 Liriomyza montana Sehgal, 1968 i c g
 Liriomyza montella Spencer, 1986 i c g
 Liriomyza montis Spencer, 1986 i c g
 Liriomyza montserratensis Spencer, 1984 c g
 Liriomyza mosquerensis Sanabria de Arevalo, 1993 c g
 Liriomyza mosselensis Spencer, 1965 c g
 Liriomyza myrsinitae Hering, 1957 c g
 Liriomyza nana Spencer, 1965 c g
 Liriomyza nares Boucher & Wheeler, 2001 c g
 Liriomyza navarinensis Spencer, 1982 c g
 Liriomyza nietzkei Spencer, 1973 c g
 Liriomyza nigra Spencer, 1984 c g
 Liriomyza nigrifrons Hendel, 1920 c g
 Liriomyza nigriscutellata Spencer, 1981 i c g b
 Liriomyza nigrissima Spencer, 1981 i c g
 Liriomyza nordica Spencer, 1969 i c g
 Liriomyza novissima Spencer, 1960 c g
 Liriomyza obliqua Hendel, 1931 c g
 Liriomyza obscurata Spencer, 1963 c g
 Liriomyza occipitalis Hendel, 1931 c g
 Liriomyza oldenbergi Hering, 1933 c g
 Liriomyza oleariae Spencer, 1976 c g
 Liriomyza oleariana Spencer, 1977 c g
 Liriomyza orbona (Meigen, 1830) c g
 Liriomyza orilliensis Spencer, 1969 i c g
 Liriomyza pagana Malloch, 1934 c g
 Liriomyza palauensis Spencer, 1963 c g
 Liriomyza paradigma Hering, 1936 c g
 Liriomyza paranaensis Spencer, 1966 c g
 Liriomyza pascuum (Meigen, 1838) c
 Liriomyza patagonica Malloch, 1934 c g
 Liriomyza patagoniensis Spencer, 1982 c g
 Liriomyza paumensis Spencer, 1981 i c g
 Liriomyza pechumani Spencer, 1986 i c g
 Liriomyza pectinimentula Sasakawa, 2005 c g
 Liriomyza peleensis Spencer, 1969 i c g
 Liriomyza penella Spencer, 1982 c g
 Liriomyza penita Spencer, 1976 c g
 Liriomyza pereziae Hering, 1963 c g
 Liriomyza periorbita Hendel, 1931 c g
 Liriomyza persica Griffiths, 1963 c g
 Liriomyza peruensis Zlobin, 2001 c g
 Liriomyza peullae (Malloch, 1934) c g
 Liriomyza philadelphi Sasakawa, 1961 c g
 Liriomyza philadelphivora Spencer, 1969 i c g
 Liriomyza phryne Hendel, 1931 c g
 Liriomyza pictella (Thomson, 1869) i c g
 Liriomyza pilicornis  b
 Liriomyza pilosa Spencer, 1969 i c g
 Liriomyza pisivora Hering, 1957 c g
 Liriomyza pistilla  b
 Liriomyza plantaginella Spencer, 1976 c g
 Liriomyza politella Malloch, 1934 c g
 Liriomyza polygalae hering, 1927 c g
 Liriomyza polygalae hering , 1927 g
 Liriomyza praeusta Sasakawa, 1961 c g
 Liriomyza primitiva Spencer, 1977 c g
 Liriomyza prostrata (Sasakawa, 1963) c g
 Liriomyza pseudopygmina Hering, 1933 c g
 Liriomyza ptarmicae Meijere, 1925 i c g b
 Liriomyza puella (Meigen, 1830) c g
 Liriomyza pulchella Sasakawa, 1961 c g
 Liriomyza pulloides Spencer, 1986 i c g
 Liriomyza pusilla (Meigen, 1830) c g
 Liriomyza pusio (Meigen, 1830) c g
 Liriomyza quadrata Malloch, 1934 c g
 Liriomyza quadrisetosa (Malloch, 1913) i c g
 Liriomyza quiquevittata Sasakawa, 1994 c g
 Liriomyza ranunculoides Spencer, 1969 i c g
 Liriomyza richteri hering, 1927 c g
 Liriomyza richteri hering , 1927 g
 Liriomyza robiniae Valley, 1982 i g
 Liriomyza robustae Spencer, 1984 c g
 Liriomyza sabaziae Spencer, 1963 i c g
 Liriomyza samogitica Pakalniskis, 1996 g
 Liriomyza santafecina Sanabria de Arevalo, 1993 c g
 Liriomyza sativae Blanchard, 1938 i c g b  (vegetable leaf miner)
 Liriomyza scaevolae Spencer, 1977 c g
 Liriomyza schlingeri Spencer i c g
 Liriomyza schmidti (Aldrich, 1929) i c g b
 Liriomyza schmidtiana Spencer, 1973 c g
 Liriomyza schwabei Spencer, 1963 c g
 Liriomyza scorzonerae Ryden, 1951 c g
 Liriomyza securicornis Sasakawa, 1961 c g
 Liriomyza seneciella Spencer, 1963 c g
 Liriomyza senecionivora Sehgal, 1971 i c g
 Liriomyza septentrionalis Sehgal, 1968 i c g b
 Liriomyza serriolae Hering, 1955 c g
 Liriomyza similis Spencer, 1981 i c g
 Liriomyza simulator Malloch, 1934 c g
 Liriomyza singula Spencer, 1969 i c g
 Liriomyza sinuata Sehgal, 1971 i c g
 Liriomyza smilacinae Spencer, 1969 i c g b
 Liriomyza socialis Spencer, 1969 i c g
 Liriomyza solanita Spencer, 1963 c g
 Liriomyza solanivora Spencer, 1973 c g
 Liriomyza solivaga Spencer, 1971 c g
 Liriomyza sonchi Hendel, 1931 c g
 Liriomyza soror Hendel, 1931 c g
 Liriomyza sorosis (Williston, 1896) i c g
 Liriomyza specifica Spencer, 1981 i c g
 Liriomyza spencerella Valladares, 1985 c g
 Liriomyza splendens Spencer, 1986 i c g
 Liriomyza stachyos Spencer, 1981 i c g
 Liriomyza strigata Meigen, 1830 c g
 Liriomyza strigosa Spencer, 1963 c g
 Liriomyza strumosa Sasakawa, 2008 g
 Liriomyza subachoquensis Sanabria de Arevalo, 1993 c g
 Liriomyza subartemisicola Frey, 1945 c g
 Liriomyza subasclepiadis Spencer, 1986 i c g
 Liriomyza subflavopicta Sasakawa, 1998 c g
 Liriomyza subinsignis Spencer, 1982 c g
 Liriomyza subobliqua Hendel, 1931 c g
 Liriomyza subpusilla (Malloch, 1914) c g
 Liriomyza subsativae Sasakawa, 1992 c g
 Liriomyza subvirgo Rohdendorf-Holmanova, 1960 c g
 Liriomyza suecica Ryden, 1956 c g
 Liriomyza sylvatica Sehgal, 1971 i c g
 Liriomyza synedrellae Martinez, 1992 c g
 Liriomyza tanaceti de Meijere, 1924 c g
 Liriomyza taraxaci Hering, 1927 i c g b
 Liriomyza taraxaci hering , 1927 g
 Liriomyza taurica Zlobin, 2002 c g
 Liriomyza temperata Spencer, 1986 i c g
 Liriomyza tenera Spencer, 1977 c g
 Liriomyza tequendamae Spencer, 1963 c g
 Liriomyza tetrachaeta Zlobin, 2002 c g
 Liriomyza texella Spencer, 1986 i c g
 Liriomyza thalictri Hering, 1932 c g
 Liriomyza thesii Hering, 1924 c g
 Liriomyza tibidabensis Spencer, 1966 c g
 Liriomyza togata (Melander, 1913) i c g
 Liriomyza tragopogonis De Meijere, 1928 c g
 Liriomyza trifoliearum Spencer, 1973 i c g b
 Liriomyza trifolii (Burgess, 1880) i c g b  (American serpentine leafminer)
 Liriomyza trivialis Spencer, 1973 c g
 Liriomyza tubifer Melander, 1913 c g
 Liriomyza tubula Spencer, 1981 i c g
 Liriomyza tumbrensis Spencer, 1982 c g
 Liriomyza umbilici hering, 1927 c g
 Liriomyza umbilici hering , 1927 g
 Liriomyza umbrina (Watt, 1923) c g
 Liriomyza umbrinella (Watt, 1923) c g
 Liriomyza umbrosa (Watt, 1923) c g
 Liriomyza undulata Spencer, 1969 i
 Liriomyza undulatimentula Sasakawa, 1992 c g
 Liriomyza urophorina Mik, 1894 c g
 Liriomyza urticae (Watt, 1924) c g
 Liriomyza valerianae Hendel, 1932 c g
 Liriomyza valerianellae Hering, 1957 c g
 Liriomyza valladaresae  g
 Liriomyza variata (Malloch, 1913) i c g
 Liriomyza veluta Spencer, 1969 i c g
 Liriomyza venegasiae Spencer, 1981 i c g b
 Liriomyza venturensis Spencer, 1981 i c g
 Liriomyza vicina Spencer, 1976 c g
 Liriomyza vicunella Spencer, 1982 c g
 Liriomyza violicaulis Hering, 1962 c g
 Liriomyza violiphaga Hendel, 1932 c g
 Liriomyza violivora  b
 Liriomyza virginica Spencer, 1986 i c g
 Liriomyza virgo (Zetterstedt, 1838) i c g
 Liriomyza virgula Frey, 1946 c g
 Liriomyza viticola (Sasakawa, 1972) c g
 Liriomyza vitrimentula Sasakawa, 1994 c g
 Liriomyza volatilis Spencer, 1965 c g
 Liriomyza vulcanica Zlobin, 1997 c g
 Liriomyza wachtlii Hendel, 1920 c g
 Liriomyza wahlenbergiae Spencer, 1976 c g
 Liriomyza watti Spencer, 1976 c g
 Liriomyza xanthocera (Czerny, 1909) c g
 Liriomyza yasumatsui Sasakawa, 1972 c g
 Liriomyza zinniae Spencer, 1981 i c g

Data sources: i = ITIS, c = Catalogue of Life, g = GBIF, b = Bugguide.net

References

Liriomyza
Articles created by Qbugbot